"Till You Get Enough" is a song written by Al McKay, Charles Wright, James Gadson, John Rayford, and Melvin Dunlap and performed by the Watts 103rd Street Rhythm Band. The song was produced by Wright and arranged by Wright, Rayford, Gabe Flemings, and Ray Jackson, and was featured on their 1969 album, In the Jungle, Babe.

Chart performance
"Till You Get Enough" reached #12 on the R&B chart and #67 on the Billboard Hot 100 in 1969.  \

References

1969 songs
1969 singles
Songs written by Al McKay
Charles Wright & the Watts 103rd Street Rhythm Band songs
Warner Records singles